Ernest Bubley (1912-1996) was a male English international table tennis player.

Table tennis career
He won a bronze medal at the 1939 World Table Tennis Championships in the Swaythling Cup (men's team event) with Ken Hyde, Hyman Lurie, Ken Stanley and Arthur Wilmott.

Personal life
Ernest Bubley was left-handed. His strength was his backhand and always wore a glove while playing on his left hand to protect his skin, as he often played the violin. He married Jaqueline Alge on 29 January 1948.

See also
 List of England players at the World Team Table Tennis Championships
 List of World Table Tennis Championships medalists

References

English male table tennis players
1912 births
1996 deaths
World Table Tennis Championships medalists